Hazelwood Park may refer to:

Hazelwood Park, South Australia, a suburb of Adelaide
Hazelwood Park, Adelaide, a  park in the suburb
Hazelwood Park (New Bedford, Massachusetts)